Protocols is the debut studio album by American Hasidic anti-folk singer Rav Shmuel. It was produced by Michael Ferrentino and ex-Wonder Stuff drummer Andres Karu and released on September 8, 2006 by Jewish Music Group. The album title is a reference to the infamous antisemitic hoax The Protocols of the Elders of Zion, which Rav Shmuel sarcastically confesses to in the album's title track.

Singles
The album's lead single, "Protocols" was released in music video form on November 2, 2006. The lyrics respond to antisemitism by jokingly confessing that The Protocols of the Elders of Zion, an infamous hoax text purporting to be Jewish plans for world domination, is completely accurate. The song's animated music video, created by Erik Horvitz, depicts Rav Shmuel interacting with celebrities like Mel Gibson, Jerry Seinfeld, Steven Spielberg, and Madonna, as well as historical figures including Theodor Herzl and Karl Marx, and references several Jewish stereotypes.

A music video for "Somebody Else", directed by Francesco Thomas, was released on September 28, 2012. The video depicts Rav Shmuel as a captain aboard the RMS Queen Mary and shows several people, including performers on Hollywood Boulevard and star names on the Hollywood Walk of Fame, obscured by handheld question-mark signs.

Reception
AllMusic's Stewart Mason gave the album 3.5 out of 5 stars, calling it "an immediately likable bit of good-humored anti-folk that doesn't require the visuals -- or even the knowledge that, yes, Rav Shmuel really is a Hasidic rabbi -- to get across." Ben Jacobson of The Jerusalem Post described it as "contemporary, fun and accessible but made heavier by a nuanced, early Dylan-like smirking sense of doom."

Track listing

Personnel
Rav Shmuel – primary artist, photography
Andres Karu – record producer, engineer, mixing, performer
Michael Ferrentino – producer
Summer Ray Brown – project assistant
Richard Foos – project assistant
Leonard Korobkin – project assistant
David McLees – project assistant
Yehuda Remer – project assistant
Dean Schachtel – project assistant
Candy Shipley – project assistant
Stuart Wax – project assistant

References 

2006 debut albums
Rav Shmuel (musician) albums